Leptataspis discolor is a species of froghoppers belonging to the family Cercopidae.

Distribution
This species is present in Indonesia and Papua New Guinea.

References 

 Boisduval J. A. 1835 - Hémiptères. In: Dumont d'Urville J. S. C. 1835 - Voyage de découvertes de l'Astrolabe exécuté par ordre du Roi, pendant les années 1826-1827-1828-1829. Faune entomologique de l'Océan Pacifique avec l'illustration des insectes nouveaux recueillis pendant le voyage, 2. p. 609-622.

External links
 ODSFM

Cercopidae
Endemic fauna of Papua New Guinea
Insects described in 1835